Tomb KV34 in the Valley of the Kings (near the modern-day Egyptian city of Luxor) was the tomb of 18th Dynasty Pharaoh Thutmose III.

The tomb was plundered in antiquity and its location lost. It was rediscovered and first excavated in 1898 under Victor Loret.

One of the first tombs to be dug in the Valley, it was cut high in the cliff face of the furthermost wadi. On the way up the staircase to the tomb, on the cliff wall, is graffiti done by workmen building the tomb. A steep corridor leads down, in a dog-leg shape, from the entrance past a deep well to a trapezoidal antechamber. Beyond the antechamber lies the cartouche-shaped burial chamber, off which stand four smaller side chambers. The stone sarcophagus in which Thutmose's body was placed is still in place in the burial chamber, albeit damaged by tomb robbers.

Many of the wall decorations are in an unusual style not found elsewhere in the Valley of the Kings. On a yellow-tinged background (intended to resemble aged papyrus), the earliest known version of the Amduat is traced, depicting the ancient Egyptian deities as simple (almost naive) stick figures, in papyrus writing style. The Litany of Ra also appears in the burial chamber, with a similar execution.

Gallery

External links

Theban Mapping Project: KV34 includes description, images, and plans of the tomb.

1898 archaeological discoveries
Buildings and structures completed in the 15th century BC
Valley of the Kings
Thutmose III